Millesimo ( or , locally  or) is a comune (municipality) in the Province of Savona in the Italian region Liguria, located about  west of Genoa and about  northwest of Savona. 

Millesimo borders the following municipalities: Cengio, Cosseria, Murialdo, Osiglia, Pallare, Plodio, and Roccavignale.

See also
 Battle of Millesimo

References

 

Cities and towns in Liguria